Henry F. W. Little (June 27, 1842 – February 7, 1907) was a Sergeant in the 7th New Hampshire Infantry, Union Army, and a Medal of Honor recipient for his actions in the American Civil War. 

In 1896, he published a history of his regiment under the title The Seventh Regiment New Hampshire Volunteers in the War of the Rebellion.

Medal of Honor citation
Rank and organization: Sergeant, Company D, 7th New Hampshire Infantry. Place and date: Near Richmond, Va., September 1864. Entered service at: New Hampshire. Birth: Manchester, N.H. Date of issue: January 14, 1870.

Citation:

Gallantry on the skirmish line.

See also

List of Medal of Honor recipients
List of American Civil War Medal of Honor recipients: G–L

References

External links

  from Sgt. Little's book  The Seventh Regiment New Hampshire Volunteers in the War of the Rebellion

1842 births
1907 deaths
United States Army Medal of Honor recipients
Union Army soldiers
People of New Hampshire in the American Civil War
People from Manchester, New Hampshire
American Civil War recipients of the Medal of Honor